Ingolf Gorges (1940–2008) was a German stage, film and television actor. Based in East Germany, he appeared in a number of DEFA films during the 1960s.

Selected filmography
 Love's Confusion (1959)
 Das Leben beginnt (1960)
 Streng geheim (1963)
 Pension Boulanka (1964)
 Ways across the Country (1968, TV series)
 Rendezvous mit Unbekannt (1969, TV series)
 Die Toten bleiben jung (1969, TV series)
 Anflug Alpha I (1971)
 The Blind Judge (1984, TV series)
 The Black Forest Clinic (1985, TV series)
 Detektivbüro Roth (1986, TV series)
 Bullet to Beijing (1995)
 Midnight in Saint Petersburg (1996)
 The Secret of Sagal (1997, TV series)

References

Bibliography
 John Cunningham. The Cinema of Istvan Szabo: Visions of Europe. Columbia University Press, 2014.
 Manfred Wekwerth. Daring to Play: A Brecht Companion. Routledge, 2012.

External links

1940 births
2008 deaths
German male film actors
German male stage actors
German male television actors
Actors from Magdeburg